Marlon Fernández may refer to:

 Marlon Fernández (singer) (born 1977), Cuban singer
 Marlon Fernández (footballer) (born 1986), Venezuelan footballer